The Coffee Shop  is a Ugandan drama  television series written by Patricia Achiro Olwoch directed by Mukeera Dennis Josiah.  The first season of the series premiered on Urban TV Uganda on 1 December 2015 and aired Sundays at 7 pm.
The series second season premiered on Urban TV Uganda on 8 January 2017. The series was awarded Best TV Series 2016 at UFF2016.

Plot
Mrs. Muturi, a coffee shop owner, takes an interest in the lives of four regular customers, Lisa, Christine, Monica, and Adam, after they help her through a bad week. Mrs. Muturi's relationship with the widower Mr. Tendo is also a part of the show.

Production
The Coffee Shop is a Vision Group production.

Cast
Mrs Muturi - Owner of the coffee shop, originally from Kenya, trying to make a living in Kampala, Uganda.
Mr. Alex Tendo
Tania Shakirah Kankindi as Lisa
Monica
Allan
Mike

Awards & Nominations

See also
Beneath The Lies
Yat Madit
Deception NTV
Balikoowa in the City
The Campus (TV Series)
The Hostel (TV Series)

References

Ugandan drama television series
2010s Ugandan television series
2015 Ugandan television series debuts